Toprak Island (literally "Soil Island") is an Aegean island of Turkey. (It is sometimes called Vardalkapı Island) It is uninhabited. At  it is administratively a part of Milas ilçe (district) of Muğla Province.

References

Aegean islands
Islands of Turkey
Islands of Muğla Province
Milas District